Farfield is one of the seven boarding houses at Gresham's, an English public school at Holt, Norfolk.

Farfield is currently home to approximately fifty boys.

History and traditions
Farfield was the third new boarding house to be built at the school, following its move from the town centre to the Cromer Road at the beginning of the 20th century, in a surge of renewal and expansion at Gresham's led by George Howson. Completed in 1911, it was shortly followed by a new school chapel.

The first housemaster, Major J. C. Miller, and boys were transferred from a smaller house called Bengal Lodge. The school magazine noted that a useful donkey was being kept in an outbuilding at Farfield.

The young Benjamin Britten recorded his life at Farfield in the 1920s and 1930s in his diaries. In 1929, he mentions that the house then had two "sickrooms" of its own. He commented that the Honours System was a positive failure, as "It is no good trying the Honours System on boys who have no honour."

The school was evacuated to Newquay in Cornwall during the years 1940–1945, but the division into houses was continued there, and Farfield occupied the Pentire Hotel. There were thus some Farfield boys who never set foot in the house.

The traditions of the house include an Entertainment, held every March, which features music, sketches, and dramatic scenes. The ritual of House Prayers is maintained in Farfield on three evenings of the week. This is a short evening service, organised by the prefects, which consists of a hymn, a reading, and a prayer, and concludes with the familiar mantra "Goodnight Boys".

The symbol of Farfield is an owl.

Features
Between August and September, the Farfield Lawn is home to one of the finest colonies in Great Britain of the orchid Spiranthes spiralis, also known as Autumn Ladies'-tresses.

The grand piano in the common room is a Bechstein given by the Worshipful Company of Fishmongers. It is believed that Benjamin Britten used it to compose his anthem A Hymn to the Virgin.

Housemasters

* in Bengal Lodge until 1911

Assistant Housemasters

Notable old boys
Many old boys have achieved success or notoriety.  Names are in chronological order, and the years at Farfield (or its predecessor Bengal Lodge) are given in round brackets.

Dr Hildebrand Hervey FRS (1902–1906) – marine biologist
Lord Reith (1904–1906) – first Director General of the BBC, later politician
Donald Cunnell (1909–1910) – World War I flying ace who shot down and injured the Red Baron
Tom Wintringham (1912–1915) General Strike planner, commander of the British contingent of the International Brigades in the Spanish Civil War, founder of The Daily Worker (subsequently The Morning Star)
W. H. Auden (1920–1925) – poet<ref>Wystan Hugh Auden, The Complete Works of W. H. Auden: Prose 1949–1955, Volume 3 (Princeton University Press, 2008), p. 771</ref> 
Benjamin Britten (1928–1930) – composer and conductorJohn Evans, ed., Journeying Boy: The Diaries of the Young Benjamin Britten (2010), p. 14
Norman Cohn (1929–1933) – historian and Fellow of the British Academy
Bill Mason (1929–1934) – film director and father of Pink Floyd drummer Nick Mason
David Hand (1932–1937) – Archbishop of Papua New Guinea
Major General A. E. Younger (1933–1937) – soldier
John Bradburne (1934–1939) – soldier, missionary
Sir Philip Dowson (1938–1942) – architect and President of the Royal Academy
Robert Aagaard (1944–1949), furniture maker and founder of the youth movement Cathedral Camps
Martin Burgess (1944–1949) – master clockmaker
Dr Anthony Yates (1946–1948) – rheumatologist
Dr Colin Leakey (1947–1952) – botanist
Sir John Tusa (1949–1954) – TV presenter and managing director of the BBC World ServiceRayner, p. 30
Stephen Frears (1954–1959) – film directorRayner, p. 37
Robert Eagle (1961–1965) – writer and director
Roger Carpenter (1958–1963) – neurophysiologist
Nigel Dick (1966–1971) – music video director
Jeremy Bamber (1974–1979) – convicted for five murders
Matt Arnold (1975–1980) – television presenter
Nick Youngs (1976–1978) – England rugby union footballerRayner, p. 84
Paddy O'Connell (1979–1983) – BBC radio and television presenter
Ralph Firman (1988–1993) – Formula One racing driverRayner, p. 117

Roll of honour
The Following Old Boys of Bengal Lodge and Farfield gave their lives during the Great War of 1914–1918:

Armitage SW, Aveling LN, Barratt GR, Beeton RH, Biden LTGV, Brownsword DA, Cole AH, Crosse ECM, Crosse MEB, Cunnell DC, Davies LFStJ, Ellis JC, Frost GK, Johnson GB, Kirch C, Robinson HHK, Rumsby RW, Shepherd CA, Simpson JH, Thorn H, Wilson Ian Maclean & Wright JMS

         

Notes

References
 The History and Register of Gresham's School, 1555–1954 (Ipswich, 1955);
S. G. G. Benson, I Will Plant Me a Tree: an Illustrated History of Gresham's School (London: James & James, 2002)
John Rayner, ed., Old Greshamian Club Address Book 1999 (Cromer: Cheverton & Son, 1999)
 The Gresham'' Magazine Vol. III & IV
Gresham's School online

External links
 Gresham's photo from the Britten-Pears library
 Newsletter of the Auden Society at audensociety.org

1911 establishments in England
Gresham's School
Houses in Norfolk